A Far Country is a play by Henry Denker. The work premiered on Broadway at the Music Box Theatre on April 4, 1961, where it closed on November 25, 1961, after 271 performances. Produced by Roger L. Stevens and Joel Schenker, the production was directed by Alfred Ryder and used sets by Donald Oenslager and costumes by Ann Roth. Lead actress Kim Stanley (Ryder's wife at the time) was nominated for a Tony Award for her portrayal of Elizabeth von Ritter.

References

External links

Broadway plays
1961 plays
Works about Sigmund Freud